Abysmal Torment is a death metal band from Malta formed in 2000 by Nick Farrugia. The current line-up includes Nick Farrugia (vocals), Melchior Borg (vocals), David Depasquale (guitars), Max Vassallo (drums) and Claudio Toscano (bass).

History

Early years (2000–2002) 
Abysmal Torment hails from the island of Malta, and emerged in 2000 as a violent death metal band under the name Molested. Although undergoing various line up changes, Abysmal Torment performed their first notable stage gig for the first time in 2002. The band writes music reliant on speed stimulated tempos, breakdowns, technical riffing and a dual assault of varying gurgling vocals. Their music also features dark lyrical content, often including themes of death and gore.

Incised Wound Suicide (2002–2005) 
Abysmal Torment began recording at Temple Studios for the first time in 2004 to record their debut album entitled Insiced Wound Suicide, which was described as consisting of five “drum kit mashing, guitar shredding, vocal chord wrecking ultra fucking brutal death metal” tracks. The album received many encouraging reviews and signed a 3-year album deal with the underground label Brutal Bands in the United States. Their first release under Brutal Bands was the re-release of Incised Wound Suicide.

Epoch Of Methodic Carnage (2005–2007) 
The band released their second studio album, Epoch of Methodic Carnage, in February 2006 on Brutal Records. The album included 10 brand new tracks which were recorded once again at Temple Studios with producer David Vella, and featured artwork from Tony Koehl. The album was distributed through major labels in Europe, the United States, and the rest of the world. Summer 2006 was a huge disappointment for Abysmal Torment as they were forced to cancel a full blown American tour with Beneath the Massacre, Neuraxis and Victimas plus well known festivals such as The Gathering of the Sick and Central Illinois Metal Fest.

In August 2007, Abysmal Torment traveled to Italy for the South Extreme Noise Festival and later traveled Europe with a 23 date tour throughout 12 countries together with Sanatorium, headlining fests such as the Ludwigshafen Deathfest, Slovak Deathfest and Luzern Deathfest. A short while after this tour, the band flew to the Netherlands to headline yet another deathfest, the Drachten Deathfest.

Omnicide (2008–2010) 
The band recorded their 3rd and highly anticipated album, Omnicide, this time at SpineSplitter Studios. In addition, they appeared in a number of European shows and also headlined the Hellvetia Festival in Switzerland. Omnicide was then released and distributed worldwide under Brutal Bands in April 2009. The band embarked on a second European Tour in 2009 supporting the release of Omnicide together with Insidious Discrepancy and Cerebral Bore. During this period, Abysmal Torment played what some consider to be their best shows to date at the NRW Deathfest in Germany with Sinister and Ghoul, Meh Suff metal-fest in Switzerland together with Belphegor and Debauchery and the Way of Darkness festival in Germany, together with death metal bands such as Cannibal Corpse, Vader, Marduk, Dying Fetus and Malevolent Creation. In 2010 the band also performed at various European Festivals, namely the renowned Open Air Deathfest in Hunxe, Germany and Neurotic Deathfest in the Netherlands in 2010.

On 17 August 2010, Abysmal Torment received the news that former drummer Wayne Vella died in an accident at his place of work. He was featured on all three Abysmal Torment releases. The band immediately issued a statement on their official pages confirming the tragedy;

Today is a sad day for us all. Unfortunately we have lost our brother Wayne Vella (Drummer in Abysmal Torment from 2001–2008) who had just turned 25. He will be remembered by us as a great friend & excellent drummer. We will never forget the great times we shared together & all the awesome experiences. May he rest in peace... & hope he is in a better place. Condolences to all his loved ones! Much respect, Abysmal Torment!

2011–2014 
Abysmal Torment headlined two tours in 2011, Butchers on the Road Tour in Russia and the Supreme Tyrant in Europe Tour. Later that year, Gordon Formosa quit the band after being a member for more than 10 years. The band recruited two new members, Melchior Borg on vocals, and the addition of a second guitarist, Kurt Pace. Abysmal Torment went on to play at numerous festivals in Europe, including Mountains of Death in Switzerland, the first annual Malta Deathfest and returned once again to The Way of Darkness.

Cultivate The Apostate (2014–2018) 
Abysmal Torment's 3rd full-length studio album was released for the first time under Willowtip Records. Cultivate the Apostate was recorded at SpineSplitter Studio and mixed and mastered by 16th Cellar Studio. Album concept and art was handled by Michal Loranc. During this period, Abysmal Torment embarked on touring around Europe on numerous occasions, playing festivals such as, Berlin Deathfest, Carnage Feast, Monthly Assault and once again played  the NRW Deathfest. Soon after the touring cycle, Kurt Pace parted ways with the band on amicable terms. Meanwhile, the rest of the band carried on writing and producing new material in preparation for the follow up to Cultivate the Apostate.

The Misanthrope (2018-present) 
On 1 February 2018, Abysmal Torment announced, via their Facebook page, the completion of the new album which would be titled The Misanthrope, set to be released on 21 September of the same year. The Misanthrope was recorded, mixed and mastered at SpineSplitter Studio. Photography for the Cover Art was taken by Lee Jeffries and additional editing carried out by Michal Loranc. On 21 July 2018, the band released the track titled Squalid Thoughts as a teaser prior to the full release and was well received upon its release. For The Misanthrope, Abysmal Torment switched to 8 string guitars, which would result in the band further downtuning their sound. Amidst news on the upcoming release and preparations for live duties, the band parted ways with their longstanding bassist Karl Romano. On 3 August, Claudio Toscano was announced as having joined the band to fill in bass duties for the upcoming endeavours. On 11 September the band released their first official music video for the album's title track, The Misanthrope, which was soon followed by the official release on the full album.

Discography 
Incised Wound Suicide (mini-CD, Self Released, 2004)
Incised Wound Suicide (mini-CD, Brutal Bands (re-issue), 2004)
Epoch of Methodic Carnage (CD, Brutal Bands, 2006)
Omnicide (CD, Brutal Bands, 2009)
Cultivate the Apostate (CD, Willowtip Records, 2014)
The Misanthrope (CD, Willowtip Records, 2018)

Band members

Current members 
Nick Farrugia – vocals (2000–present)
David Depasquale – guitar (2003–present)
Max Vassallo – drums (2008–present)
Melchior Borg – vocals (2011–present)
Claudio Toscano – bass (2018–present)

Former members 
Mario Buhagiar – vocals (2000–2001)
Gan Pawl Bartolo – guitar (2000–2005)
Tim Vella Briffa – bass (2000–2005)
Wayne Vella – drums (2001–2008)
Gordon Formosa – vocals (2001–2011)
Ben Aquilina – bass (2006–2009)
Karl Romano – bass (2009–2017)
Kurt Pace – guitar (2011–2016)

References

External links 
 Abysmal Torment page on Facebook
 Abysmal Torment on Twitter

Maltese death metal musical groups
Technical death metal musical groups
Musical groups established in 2000